George Philip Lakoff (born May 24, 1941) is an American cognitive linguist and philosopher, best known for his thesis that people's lives are significantly influenced by the conceptual metaphors they use to explain complex phenomena.

The conceptual metaphor thesis, introduced in his and Mark Johnson's 1980 book Metaphors We Live By has found applications in a number of academic disciplines. Applying it to politics, literature, philosophy and mathematics has led Lakoff into territory normally considered basic to political science. In his 1996 book Moral Politics, Lakoff described conservative voters as being influenced by the "strict father model" as a central metaphor for such a complex phenomenon as the state, and liberal/progressive voters as being influenced by the "nurturant parent model" as the folk psychological metaphor for this complex phenomenon. According to him, an individual's experience and attitude towards sociopolitical issues is influenced by being framed in linguistic constructions. In Metaphor and War: The Metaphor System Used to Justify War in the Gulf (1991), he argues that the American involvement in the Gulf War was obscured or "spun" by the metaphors which were used by the first Bush administration to justify it.
Between 2003 and 2008, Lakoff was involved with a progressive think tank, the now defunct Rockridge Institute. He is a member of the scientific committee of the Fundación IDEAS (IDEAS Foundation), Spain's Socialist Party's think tank.

The more general theory that elaborated his thesis is known as embodied mind. Lakoff served as a professor of linguistics at the University of California, Berkeley, from 1972 until his retirement in 2016.

Work

Reappraisal of metaphor
Although some of Lakoff's research involves questions traditionally pursued by linguists, such as the conditions under which a certain linguistic construction is grammatically viable, he is best known for his reappraisal of the role that metaphors play in the socio-political life of humans.

Metaphor has been seen within the Western scientific tradition as a purely linguistic construction. The essential thrust of Lakoff's work has been the argument that metaphors are a primarily conceptual construction and are in fact central to the development of thought.

In his words: 
"Our ordinary conceptual system, in terms of which we both think and act, is fundamentally metaphorical in nature."

According to Lakoff, non-metaphorical thought is possible only when we talk about purely physical reality; the greater the level of abstraction, the more layers of metaphor are required to express it. People do not notice these metaphors for various reasons, including that some metaphors become 'dead' in the sense that we no longer recognize their origin. Another reason is that we just do not "see" what is "going on".

In intellectual debate, for instance, the underlying metaphor according to Lakoff is usually that argument is war (later revised to "argument is struggle"):
He won the argument.
Your claims are indefensible.
He shot down all my arguments.
His criticisms were right on target.
If you use that strategy, he'll wipe you out.

According to Lakoff, the development of thought has been the process of developing better metaphors. He also points out that the application of one domain of knowledge to another offers new perceptions and understandings.

Linguistics wars

Lakoff began his career as a student and later a teacher of the theory of transformational grammar developed by Massachusetts Institute of Technology professor Noam Chomsky. In the late 1960s, however, he joined with others to promote generative semantics as an alternative to Chomsky's generative syntax. In an interview he stated:

Lakoff's claim that Chomsky asserts independence between syntax and semantics has been rejected by Chomsky, who holds the following view: 

In response to Lakoff's making the above claim about Chomsky's view, Chomsky claimed that Lakoff has "virtually no comprehension of the work he is discussing". Despite Lakoff's mischaracterization of Chomsky's view on the matter, their linguistic positions diverge significantly; this rift between Generative Grammar and Generative Semantics led to fierce, acrimonious debates among linguists that have come to be known as the "linguistics wars".

Embodied mind

When Lakoff claims the mind is "embodied", he is arguing that almost all of human cognition, up through the most abstract reasoning, depends on and makes use of such concrete and "low-level" facilities as the sensorimotor system and the emotions. Therefore, embodiment is a rejection not only of dualism vis-a-vis mind and matter, but also of claims that human reason can be basically understood without reference to the underlying "implementation details".

Lakoff offers three complementary but distinct sorts of arguments in favor of embodiment. First, using evidence from neuroscience and neural network simulations, he argues that certain concepts, such as color and spatial relation concepts (e.g. "red" or "over"; see also qualia), can be almost entirely understood through the examination of how processes of perception or motor control work.

Second, based on cognitive linguistics' analysis of figurative language, he argues that the reasoning we use for such abstract topics as warfare, economics, or morality is somehow rooted in the reasoning we use for such mundane topics as spatial relationships. (See conceptual metaphor.)

Finally, based on research in cognitive psychology and some investigations in the philosophy of language, he argues that very few of the categories used by humans are actually of the black-and-white type amenable to analysis in terms of necessary and sufficient conditions. On the contrary, most categories are supposed to be much more complicated and messy, just like our bodies.

"We are neural beings", Lakoff states, "Our brains take their input from the rest of our bodies. What our bodies are like and how they function in the world thus structures the very concepts we can use to think. We cannot think just anything — only what our embodied brains permit."

Lakoff believes consciousness to be neurally embodied, however he explicitly states that the mechanism is not just neural computation alone. Using the concept of disembodiment, Lakoff supports the physicalist approach to the afterlife. If the soul can not have any of the properties of the body, then Lakoff claims it can not feel, perceive, think, be conscious, or have a personality. If this is true, then Lakoff asks what would be the point of the afterlife?

Many scientists share the belief that there are problems with falsifiability and foundation ontologies purporting to describe "what exists", to a sufficient degree of rigor to establish a reasonable method of empirical validation. But Lakoff takes this further to explain why hypotheses built with complex metaphors cannot be directly falsified. Instead, they can only be rejected based on interpretations of empirical observations guided by other complex metaphors. This is what he means when he says that falsifiability itself can never be established by any reasonable method that would not rely ultimately on a shared human bias. The bias he's referring to is the set of conceptual metaphors governing how people interpret observations.

Lakoff is, with coauthors Mark Johnson and Rafael E. Núñez, one of the primary proponents of the embodied mind thesis. Lakoff discussed these themes in his 2001 Gifford Lectures at the University of Glasgow, published as The Nature and Limits of Human Understanding. Others who have written about the embodied mind include philosopher Andy Clark (See his Being There), philosopher and neurobiologists Humberto Maturana and Francisco Varela and his student Evan Thompson (See Varela, Thompson & Rosch's The Embodied Mind), roboticists such as Rodney Brooks, Rolf Pfeifer and Tom Ziemke, the physicist David Bohm (see his Thought As A System), Ray Gibbs (see his Embodiment and Cognitive Science), John Grinder and Richard Bandler in their neuro-linguistic programming, and Julian Jaynes. The work of these writers can be traced back to earlier philosophical writings, most notably in the phenomenological tradition, such as Maurice Merleau-Ponty and Heidegger. The basic thesis of "embodied mind" is also traceable to the American contextualist or pragmatist tradition, notably John Dewey in such works as Art As Experience.

Mathematics
According to Lakoff, even mathematics is subjective to the human species and its cultures: thus "any question of math's being inherent in physical reality is moot, since there is no way to know whether or not it is." By this, he is saying that there is nothing outside of the thought structures we derive from our embodied minds that we can use to "prove" that mathematics is somehow beyond biology. Lakoff and Rafael E. Núñez (2000) argue at length that mathematical and philosophical ideas are best understood in light of the embodied mind. The philosophy of mathematics ought therefore to look to the current scientific understanding of the human body as a foundation ontology, and abandon self-referential attempts to ground the operational components of mathematics in anything other than "meat".

Mathematical reviewers have generally been critical of Lakoff and Núñez, pointing to mathematical errors. Lakoff claims that these errors have been corrected in subsequent printings. Although their book attempts a refutation of some of the most widely accepted viewpoints in philosophy of mathematics and advice for how the field might proceed, they have yet to elicit much of a reaction from philosophers of mathematics themselves. The small community specializing in the psychology of mathematical learning, to which Núñez belongs, is paying attention.

Lakoff has also claimed that we should remain agnostic about whether math is somehow wrapped up with the very nature of the universe. Early in 2001 Lakoff told the American Association for the Advancement of Science (AAAS): "Mathematics may or may not be out there in the world, but there's no way that we scientifically could possibly tell." This is because the structures of scientific knowledge are not "out there" but rather in our brains, based on the details of our anatomy. Therefore, we cannot "tell" that mathematics is "out there" without relying on conceptual metaphors rooted in our biology. This claim bothers those who believe that there really is a way we could "tell". The falsifiability of this claim is perhaps the central problem in the cognitive science of mathematics, a field that attempts to establish a foundation ontology based on the human cognitive and scientific process.

Political significance and involvement
Lakoff has publicly expressed some of his political views and his ideas about the conceptual structures that he views as central to understanding the political process. He almost always discusses the former in terms of the latter.

Moral Politics (1996, revisited in 2002) gives book-length consideration to the conceptual metaphors that Lakoff sees as present in the minds of American "liberals" and "conservatives". The book is a blend of cognitive science and political analysis. Lakoff makes an attempt to keep his personal views confined to the last third of the book, where he explicitly argues for the superiority of the liberal vision.

Lakoff argues that the differences in opinions between liberals and conservatives follow from the fact that they subscribe with different strength to two different central metaphors about the relationship of the state to its citizens. Both, he claims, see governance through metaphors of the family. Conservatives would subscribe more strongly and more often to a model that he calls the "strict father model" and has a family structured around a strong, dominant "father" (government), and assumes that the "children" (citizens) need to be disciplined to be made into responsible "adults" (morality, self-financing). Once the "children" are "adults", though, the "father" should not interfere with their lives: the government should stay out of the business of those in society who have proved their responsibility. In contrast, Lakoff argues that liberals place more support in a model of the family, which he calls the "nurturant parent model", based on "nurturant values", where both "mothers" and "fathers" work to keep the essentially good "children" away from "corrupting influences" (pollution, social injustice, poverty, etc.). Lakoff says that most people have a blend of both metaphors applied at different times, and that political speech works primarily by invoking these metaphors and urging the subscription of one over the other.

Lakoff further argues that one of the reasons liberals have had difficulty since the 1980s is that they have not been as aware of their own guiding metaphors, and have too often accepted conservative terminology framed in a way to promote the strict father metaphor. Lakoff insists that liberals must cease using terms like partial birth abortion and tax relief because they are manufactured specifically to allow the possibilities of only certain types of opinions. Tax relief for example, implies explicitly that taxes are an affliction, something someone would want "relief" from. To use the terms of another metaphoric worldview, Lakoff insists, is to unconsciously support it. Liberals must support linguistic think tanks in the same way that conservatives do if they are going to succeed in appealing to those in the country who share their metaphors.

Lakoff offers advice about how to counteract politicians' lies. He maintains that the act of stating that a lie is false reinforces the lie because it repeats the way the lie is framed. Instead, he recommends what he calls a "truth sandwich":

"1.	Start with the truth. The first frame gets the advantage.
2.	Indicate the lie. Avoid amplifying the specific language if possible.
3.	Return to the truth. Always repeat truths more than lies."

Lakoff calls this a "truth sandwich" even though the baloney is in the middle. The position of the lie avoids both primacy and recency effects.

Between 2003 and 2008, Lakoff was involved with a progressive think tank, the Rockridge Institute, an involvement that follows in part from his recommendations in Moral Politics. Among his activities with the Institute, which concentrates in part on helping liberal candidates and politicians with re-framing political metaphors, Lakoff has given numerous public lectures and written accounts of his message from Moral Politics. In 2008, Lakoff joined Fenton Communications, the nation's largest public interest communications firm, as a Senior Consultant.

One of his political works, Don't Think of an Elephant! Know Your Values and Frame the Debate, self-labeled as "the Essential Guide for Progressives", was published in September 2004 and features a foreword by former Democratic presidential candidate Howard Dean.

Disagreement with Steven Pinker
In 2006 Steven Pinker wrote an unfavorable review of Lakoff's book Whose Freedom? in The New Republic. Pinker argued that Lakoff's propositions are unsupported, and his prescriptions are a recipe for electoral failure. He wrote that Lakoff was condescending and deplored Lakoff's "shameless caricaturing of beliefs" and his "faith in the power of euphemism." Pinker portrayed Lakoff's arguments as "cognitive relativism, in which mathematics, science, and philosophy are beauty contests between rival frames rather than attempts to characterize the nature of reality." Lakoff wrote a rebuttal to the review, stating that his position on many matters is the exact reverse of what Pinker attributes to him. Lakoff states that he explicitly rejects cognitive relativism, arguing that he is "a realist, both about how the mind works and how the world works. Given that the mind works by frames and metaphors, the challenge is to use such a mind to accurately characterize how the world works."

Works

Writings
2016. Moral Politics: How Liberals and Conservatives Think, Third Edition. University of Chicago Press. .
2012 with Elisabeth Wehling. The Little Blue Book: The Essential Guide to Thinking and Talking Democratic. Free Press. .
2010. 
2008. The Political Mind : Why You Can't Understand 21st-Century American Politics with an 18th-Century Brain. Viking Adult. .
2006. Whose Freedom?: The Battle over America's Most Important Idea. Farrar, Straus and Giroux. .
2006. Thinking Points: Communicating Our American Values and Vision. Farrar, Straus and Giroux. .
2005. "A Cognitive Scientist Looks at Daubert", American Journal of Public Health. 95, no. 1: S114.
2005. "The Brain's Concept: The Role of the Sensory-Motor System in Conceptual Knowledge"-Vittorio Gallese, Università di Parma and George Lakoff University of California, Berkeley
2004. Don't Think of an Elephant: Know Your Values and Frame the Debate. Chelsea Green Publishing. .
2003 (1980) with Mark Johnson. . University of Chicago Press. 2003 edition contains an 'Afterword'. .
2001 Edition. Moral Politics: How Liberals and Conservatives Think. University of Chicago Press. .
2000 with Rafael Núñez. Where Mathematics Comes From: How the Embodied Mind Brings Mathematics into Being. Basic Books. .
1999 with Mark Johnson. Philosophy In The Flesh: the Embodied Mind and its Challenge to Western Thought. Basic Books.
1996. Moral politics : What Conservatives Know that Liberals Don't. University of Chicago Press. .
1989 with Mark Turner. More Than Cool Reason: A Field Guide to Poetic Metaphor. University of Chicago Press. .
1987. Women, Fire, and Dangerous Things: What Categories Reveal About the Mind. University of Chicago Press. .
1980 with Mark Johnson. . University of Chicago Press. .
1970. Irregularity in Syntax. Holt, Rinehart, and Winston. .

Videos
How Democrats and Progressives Can Win: Solutions from George Lakoff DVD format.

See also 
Code word (figure of speech)
Cognitive linguistics
Cognitive science of mathematics
Conceptual metaphor
Embodied philosophy
Framing (social sciences)
Invariance principle
Language and thought
Metaphor
Metonymy
Prototype theory

References

Further reading
Dean, John W. (2006), Conservatives without Conscience, Viking Penguin .
Harris, Randy Allen (1995). The Linguistics Wars. Oxford University Press. . (Focuses on the disputes Lakoff and others have had with Chomsky.)
Haser, Verena (2005). Metaphor, Metonymy, and Experientialist Philosophy: Challenging Cognitive Semantics (Topics in English Linguistics), Mouton de Gruyter.  (A critical look at the ideas behind embodiment and conceptual metaphor.)
Kelleher, William J. (2005). Progressive Logic: Framing A Unified Field Theory of Values For Progressives. La CaCañada Flintridge, CA: The Empathic Science Institute. .
McGlone, M. S. (2001). "Concepts as Metaphors" in Sam Glucksberg, Understanding Figurative Language: From Metaphors to Idioms. Oxford Psychology Series 36. Oxford University Press, 90–107. .
O'Reilly, Bill (2006). Culture Warrior. New York: Broadway Books. . (Calls Lakoff the guiding philosopher behind the "secular progressive movement".)
Renkema, Jan (2004). Introduction to Discourse Studies. Amsterdam: John Benjamins. .
Rettig, Hillary (2006). The Lifelong Activist: How to Change the World Without Losing Your Way. New York: Lantern Books. . (Documents strong parallels between Lakoff's nurturant parent model of progressive thought and psychologist Abraham Maslow's model of the self-actualized individual. Also discusses framing in the context of marketing and sales with the aim of bolstering progressive activists' persuasive skills.)
Richardt, Susanne (2005). Metaphor in Languages for Special Purposes: The Function of Conceptual Metaphor in Written Expert Language and Expert-Lay Communication in the Domains of Economics, Medicine and Computing. European University Studies: Series XIV, Anglo-Saxon Language and Literature, 413. Frankfurt am Main: Peter Lang. .
Soros, George (2006). The Age of Fallibility: Consequences of the War on Terror. . (discusses Lakoff in regard to the application of his theories on the work of Frank Luntz and with respect to his own theory about perception and reality)
Winter, Steven L. (2003). A Clearing in the Forest. Chicago: University of Chicago Press. . (Applies Lakoff's work in cognitive science and metaphor to the field of law and legal reasoning.)

External links

University of California, Berkeley department of Linguistics page on George Lakoff

Edge bio of Lakoff
"Metaphor and War" (1991)
"Metaphor and War, Again" (2003)
"Thinking of Jackasses: the grand delusions of the Democratic Party", a critical review by Marc Cooper in Atlantic Monthly
"The Political Mind" a talk by George Lakoff recorded June 28, 2008 in Sacramento, CA
George Lakoff Proposes Ballot Measure to End ⅔ Rule in State Legislature – video report by Democracy Now!
Biography and summary of Gifford Lectures (University of Glasgow, 2001) by Brannon Hancock

1941 births
Living people
Linguists from the United States
American political writers
Enactive cognition
Mathematical cognition researchers
Psycholinguists
Philosophers of mathematics
University of California, Berkeley faculty
American consciousness researchers and theorists
Metaphor theorists
Framing theorists
Jewish American scientists
Jewish philosophers
20th-century American non-fiction writers
21st-century American non-fiction writers
Fellows of the Cognitive Science Society
20th-century American male writers
American male non-fiction writers
Jewish anthropologists
21st-century American male writers
21st-century American Jews